This article details the Hull F.C. rugby league football club's 2012 season. This is the seventeenth season of the Super League era.

Season review
Hull acquire new coach Peter Gentle from Wests Tigers.
Lee Radford retires as a player and becomes an assistant coach at Hull.
Shaun McRae and Andy Hay become assistant coaches for the club.
Veteran Sean Long leaves Hull FC to become an assistant coach at Salford City Reds.
Hull FC sign scrum-half Jamie Ellis from Leigh Centurions on a 2-year deal.
Hull FC sign fullback Wade McKinnon from Wests Tigers on a 3-year deal.
Hull FC sign hooker Aaron Heremaia on a 2-year deal and scrum half Brett Seymour on a 3-year deal from the New Zealand Warriors.
Danny Washbrook and Ewan Dowes join Wakefield Trinity Wildcats on 3-year and 1 year deals.
Epalahame Lauaki signs for Wigan Warriors on a 3-year deal.
Youngster Luke Briscoe joins Leeds Rhinos on a 4-year deal.
Veteran Craig Fitzgibbon retires from playing and joins Sydney Roosters as an assistant coach.
Cameron Phelps and Martin Gleeson were both released from the club.
Hull sign centre Tony Martin on a 1-year deal from Crusaders.
Hull sign Martin Aspinwall from Castleford Tigers on a 1-year deal.
Hull sign prop Eamon O'Carroll on a 3-year deal from Wigan Warriors.
Hull sign prop Andy Lynch from Bradford Bulls on a 3-year deal.
Hull sign Mike Burnett on a 1-year deal from London Broncos.
Sam Obst joins Championship side Keighley Cougars on a 1-year deal.
The 2012 Super League fixtures were announced and Hull FC will play Warrington Wolves at the KC Stadium in Round 1.
Hull FC announce that they will play 3 pre-season friendlies - 21 Jan vs. York City Knights away, 22 Jan vs. Hull Kingston Rovers at home and 27–29 Jan vs. Bradford Bulls at home.
Hull officially announce Andy Lynch as their captain for the 2012 season.
Hull FC draw their Round 1 game 20–20 against Warrington Wolves.
The Round 2 game against Catalans Dragons was postponed due to a frozen pitch.
Hull beat London Broncos 22–14 in Round 3.
Salford City Reds beat Hull 24–22 in Round 4.
Hull beat Wakefield Trinity Wildcats 14–10 in Round 5.
Hull beat St Helens R.F.C. 22–10 in Round 6.
Hull hammer Widnes Vikings 58–10 in Round 7.
Former Leeds Rhinos player Gareth Ellis signs for Hull on a 3-year deal.
Hull beat Castleford Tigers 42–28 in Round 8.
Hull defeat Bradford Bulls 24–18 in Round 9.
Hull go top of the table by beating rivals Hull Kingston Rovers 36–6 in Round 10.
Hull lose to Huddersfield Giants 22–4 in Round 11.
Hull are knocked out of the Challenge Cup 42-16 by Huddersfield Giants in the 4th Round.
Hull are heavily beating 56–12 in Round 12 by Wigan Warriors.
Wade McKinnon left the club with immediate effect.
Matty Russell joins the club on a one-month loan.
Andy Lynch signs a new contract keeping him at the KC Stadium until 2014.
Hull FC beat champions Leeds Rhinos 34–20 in Round 13.
Hull FC beat London Broncos 14–12 in Round 14.
Hull FC lose their Round 15 Magic Weekend encounter 32–30 against rivals Hull Kingston Rovers.
Jordan Turner signs a 3 Year Deal with St Helens R.F.C. for the 2013 season.
Hull F.C. announce the signing of Castleford Tigers centre Joe Arundel on a 4 Year Deal.
Hull F.C. draw with St Helens R.F.C. 18–18 in Round 16.
Hull F.C. lost 32–30 to Wakefield Trinity Wildcats in Round 17.
Fullback Matty Russell signs a one-month extension to his loan.
Hull F.C. sign prop Liam Watts from rivals Hull Kingston Rovers on a -year deal.
Hull F.C. lost 40–18 to Warrington Wolves in Round 18.
Prop Eamon O'Carroll moves to Widnes Vikings on an immediate -year deal.
Hull narrowly beat Huddersfield Giants 28–24 in Round 19.
Jamie Ellis is released and signs for Castleford Tigers whilst Ryan McGoldrick comes the opposite way and signs with the Black and Whites until the end of the year.
Hull lose 21–6 to Leeds Rhinos in Round 20.
Hull lose 44–14 to Catalans Dragons in Round 2.
Hull sign St. Helens winger Jamie Foster on a months loan while Matty Russell goes back to Wigan Warriors.
Hull beat rivals Hull Kingston Rovers 32–18 in Round 21. 
Hull beat Salford City Reds 36–24 in Round 22.
Hull lose 48–10 to Wigan Warriors in Round 23.
Hull beat Catalans Dragons 30–10 in Round 24.
Hull lose 42–16 to Widnes Vikings in Round 25.
Hull batter Bradford Bulls 70–6 in Round 26.
Hull beat Castleford Tigers 36–10 in final weekly round game.
Hull beat Huddersfield Giants 46–10 in the first playoff game.

Pre season friendlies

Dragons score is first.

Player appearances
Friendly Games Only

 = Injured

 = Suspended

Table

2012 fixtures and results

2012 Engage Super League

Player appearances
Super League Only

 = Injured

 = Suspended

Challenge Cup

Player appearances
Challenge Cup Games only

Playoffs

Player appearances
Play Off Games only

2012 squad statistics

 Appearances and Points include (Super League, Challenge Cup and Play Offs) as of 23 September 2012.

 = Injured
 = Suspended

Out of contract 2012
Players out of contract in 2012:

2012 transfers in/out
In

Out

References
Pre-Season

Super League XVI

Challenge Cup

Notes

External links

Hull F.C. seasons
Hull F.C.